Frankenstein is a novel by Mary Shelley.

Mary Shelley's Frankenstein may refer to:
Mary Shelley's Frankenstein (film), 1994 film adaptation of Mary Shelley's novel Frankenstein
Mary Shelley's Frankenstein (pinball), 1995 pinball machine based on the film
Mary Shelley's Frankenstein (video game), video game for multiple platforms based on the film

See also
Frankenstein (disambiguation)